Shanzhou District, previously known as Shan County or Shanxian or Shaan, is an urban district of Sanmenxia in western Henan, China, bordering Shanxi province to the north.

It is located on the southern bank of the Yellow River and includes the Shan Pass, which gives its name to the district and to neighboring Shaanxi.

History 
During the Neolithic era, the area was already inhabited by several large tribes. Between the 21st century BC and the 16th century BC it was ruled by the Xia Dynasty and between the 16th to the 11th century BC, it belonged to the Shang Dynasty.

In 390 BC, Shan County was established, the area was often the battleground between the Qin and Wei. In 225 BC it definitively became part of the Qin area, governed by Sanchuan commandery.

In 1952, Shan County became part of Luoyang. After the Sanmenxia Dam was (almost) completed in 1959, it became part of Sanmenxia City. In 2016 the county became Shanzhou District.

Administrative divisions
As 2012, this district is divided to 4 towns and 9 townships.
Towns

Townships

Culture 
Shanzhou is known for its Mahua fried dough snack and Guanyintang dried beef.

References

External links
 of Shan County government

County-level divisions of Henan
Sanmenxia